Idaho Legislative District 34 is one of 35 districts of the Idaho Legislature. It is currently represented by Senator Brent Hill, Republican  of Rexburg, Representative Doug Ricks, Republican of Rexburg, and Representative Britt Raybould, Republican of Rexburg.

District profile (2012–present) 
District 34 currently consists of all of Madison County and a portion of  Bonneville  County.

District profile (2002–2012) 
From 2002 to 2012, District 34 consisted of all of Madison County and a portion of Fremont County.

District profile (1992–2002) 
From 1992 to 2002, District 34 consisted of a portion of Bannock County.

District profile (1984–1992) 
From 1984 to 1992, District 34 did not exist.

See also

 List of Idaho Senators
 List of Idaho State Representatives

References

External links
Idaho Legislative District Map (with members)
Idaho Legislature (official site)

34
Bonneville County, Idaho
Madison County, Idaho